Michael Chapman (1822 – 23 February 1906) was an Irish-born Australian politician.

He was born at Cloyne to property owner William Chapman and Mary. In 1840 he migrated to New South Wales, and on 11 December 1846 he married Catherine Shanahan, with whom he had four children. A successful oil trader, he served on Sydney City Council from 1860 to 1862 and from 1866 to 1900; he was also a Glebe alderman from 1866 to 1875 and from 1878 to 1893, and mayor from 1882 to 1884. In 1883 he was elected to the New South Wales Legislative Assembly as the member for Glebe. Defeated in 1885, he returned in 1887 as a Free Trader. He was re-elected in 1889, but defeated in 1891. Chapman died at Forest Lodge in 1906.

References

 

1822 births
1906 deaths
Members of the New South Wales Legislative Assembly
Mayors and Lord Mayors of Sydney
Free Trade Party politicians
19th-century Australian politicians
Mayors of The Glebe